Hipco, also referred to as HipCo or co, is a genre of hip hop from Liberia. It has been described by The Guardian as Liberia's "unique musical style" using "vernacular speech and political messages."

History
Rap and pop music are also performed in indigenous languages across the country, with a generation of artists creating their own style of uniquely Liberian rap music called Hipco (or "Co"). Hipco is usually performed in Liberian English or the local vernacular, using the style of communication with which Liberians speak and relate to each other. Hipco evolved in the 1980s and has always had a social and political bent. In the 1990s it continued to develop through the civil wars, and today stands as a definitive mark of Liberian culture. Hipco music was becoming popular in 2000. As of 2017, it was the popular music genre of Liberia, "serving as the medium through which rappers speak against societal ills, including injustice and corruption."

The "co" in the genre is short of the Liberian dialect Kolokwa, which according to the Washington Post, "the Liberian underclass has been improvising since the early 19th century, blending the English brought by 19,000 ex-slaves with words from about 15 native tongues to attain a soft-sounding patois. Kolokwa is 99 percent an oral language — as yet, there is not a single full book in the dialect — and it is all but incomprehensible to the American ear. In Liberia, the cultural elite have long shunned it as lowbrow. Which means that when HipCo artists inject a few choice snatches of Kolokwa into otherwise English lyrics, their words have political zing." According to the Washington Post, "HipCo is to Liberia as jazz is to the United States." In 2017, Liberian historian C. Patrick Burrows stated "we're on the verge of a renaissance, and HipCo is at the leading edge of it."

Artists 
Among high-profile Hipco artists are Takun J.

Rapper Bucky-Raw described himself as a Trapco artist, a combination of Hipco and trap.

UNICEF has worked with Hipco artists to release Hipco songs on Ebola prevention, with several of the songs becoming popular on radio in the country in 2014. The Liberia Music Awards have a HipCo Artist of the Year category. The Liberian Entertainment Awards do as well.

See also 
Music of Liberia
Cultural effects of the Ebola crisis

References 

Hip hop genres
Liberian music
African hip hop